can refer to:
, a 1985 opera by Japanese composer Minoru Miki
, a Buddhist temple in Kyoto

 is the Hepburn romanization of the Japanese (kanji) word.